Copeina is a genus of fishes found in the Amazon basin.  The two described species are:
 Copeina guttata (Steindachner, 1876) (redspotted tetra)
 Copeina osgoodi C. H. Eigenmann, 1922

References

Lebiasinidae
Fish of South America
Taxa named by Henry Weed Fowler